Sven Tippelt (born 3 June 1965) is a retired German gymnast. He competed at the 1988 and 1992 Summer Olympics, finishing in second and fourth place with the East German team, respectively. Individually he won bronze medals on rings and parallel bars in 1988. He won one silver and three bronze medals at the world championships in 1985, 1987 and 1989.

After retiring from competitions he completed his physical education studies in Leipzig via distance learning, with a thesis in biomechanics. Instead of pursuing a coaching career, he became a physiotherapist and now works at a rehabilitation clinic in Bad Salzuflen.

References

1965 births
Living people
Sportspeople from Leipzig
German male artistic gymnasts
Olympic gymnasts of East Germany
Olympic gymnasts of Germany
Gymnasts at the 1988 Summer Olympics
Gymnasts at the 1992 Summer Olympics
Olympic silver medalists for East Germany
Olympic bronze medalists for East Germany
Olympic medalists in gymnastics
Medalists at the 1988 Summer Olympics
Medalists at the World Artistic Gymnastics Championships
Recipients of the Patriotic Order of Merit